Enoch Baldwin (5 August 1822 – 1905) was an English iron founder and  Liberal politician who sat in the House of Commons from 1880 to 1885.

Baldwin was the son of Enoch Baldwin, iron founder of Stourport-on-Severn, whose brother was  George Pearce Baldwin. He became a member of the family firm of Baldwin, Son & Co in 1839, becoming in time senior partner.

In 1880, Baldwin was elected Member of Parliament for Bewdley after the sitting MP Charles Harrison was unseated on petition. He held the seat until 1885. He subsequently became  JP for Worcestershire and in March 1889 a County Councillor.

Baldwin lived at The Mount, Stourport, and died at the age of 82. He was first cousin to Alfred Baldwin.

Baldwin married Elizabeth Langford Tildesley daughter of Henry Tildesley on 27 Feb 1849. She died in  1875 and he married secondly on 19 July 1876 to Emily Lydia Driver daughter of Rev. George Frederick Driver a Weslyan minister.

References

External links
 

1822 births
1905 deaths
People from Stourport-on-Severn
Liberal Party (UK) MPs for English constituencies
UK MPs 1880–1885
Councillors in Worcestershire